The United Nations Convention Against Transnational Organized Crime (UNTOC, also called the Palermo Convention) is a 2000 United Nations-sponsored multilateral treaty against transnational organized crime.

History
The convention was adopted by a resolution of the United Nations General Assembly on 15 November 2000. India joined on 12 December 2002.

The Convention came into force on 29 September 2003. According to Leoluca Orlando, Mayor of Palermo, the convention was the first international convention to fight transnational organized crime, trafficking of human beings, and terrorism.

In 2014, the UNTOC strengthened its policies regarding wildlife smuggling. Botswana signed the Anti-Human Trafficking Act of 2014 to comply with UNTOC on the human smuggling protocol.

In 2017, as Japan prepared the organization of the 2019 Rugby World Cup, and the 2020 Summer Olympics and Paralympics, it faced the issue of not being fully compliant with the UNTOC, thus jeopardizing its eligibility to organize those events.

In February 2018, Afghanistan introduced a new penal code which made the country's laws UNTOC-compliant for the first time.

Description
UNTOC's three supplementary protocols (the Palermo Protocols) are:

Protocol to Prevent, Suppress and Punish Trafficking in Persons, Especially Women and Children.
Protocol Against the Smuggling of Migrants by Land, Sea and Air.
Protocol Against the Illicit Manufacturing of and Trafficking in Firearms.

All four of these instruments contain elements of the current international law on human trafficking, arms trafficking and money laundering. The United Nations Office on Drugs and Crime (UNODC) acts as custodian of the UNTOC and its protocols.

The UNTOC is the main legal international instrument to fight organized crime, but its efficiency depends on each member's ability to implement the organization's framework. As an example, the UNTOC requires a minimum sentence of four years imprisonment for transnational organised criminal offences.

Parties
As of 27 February 2023, it has 191 parties, which includes 186 United Nations member states, the Cook Islands, the Holy See, Niue, the State of Palestine, and the European Union. The seven UN member states that are not party to the convention are (* indicates that the state has signed but not ratified the convention):

In June 2018, the Iranian Parliament approved the bill to join UNTOC, but 10 days later Ali Khamenei, Supreme Leader of Iran, called the bill "unacceptable" and blocked its progress. In January 2019, the bill was still being debated between the Parliament and the Guardian Council.

See also 
European Public Prosecutor
International Criminal Police Organization
ISO 37001 Anti-bribery management systems
United Nations Convention against Corruption

References

External links
UNODC site

Organized crime
United Nations treaties
Treaties concluded in 2000
Child labour treaties
Treaties entered into force in 2003
Treaties of the Afghan Transitional Administration
Treaties of Albania
Treaties of Algeria
Treaties of Andorra
Treaties of Angola
Treaties of Antigua and Barbuda
Treaties of Argentina
Treaties of Armenia
Treaties of Australia
Treaties of Austria
Treaties of Azerbaijan
Treaties of the Bahamas
Treaties of Bahrain
Treaties of Bangladesh
Treaties of Barbados
Treaties of Belarus
Treaties of Belgium
Treaties of Belize
Treaties of Benin
Treaties of Bhutan
Treaties of Bolivia
Treaties of Bosnia and Herzegovina
Treaties of Botswana
Treaties of Brazil
Treaties of Brunei
Treaties of Bulgaria
Treaties of Burkina Faso
Treaties of Burundi
Treaties of Cambodia
Treaties of Cameroon
Treaties of Canada
Treaties of Cape Verde
Treaties of the Central African Republic
Treaties of Chad
Treaties of Chile
Treaties of the People's Republic of China
Treaties of Colombia
Treaties of the Comoros
Treaties of the Cook Islands
Treaties of Costa Rica
Treaties of Ivory Coast
Treaties of Croatia
Treaties of Cuba
Treaties of Cyprus
Treaties of the Czech Republic
Treaties of the Democratic Republic of the Congo
Treaties of Denmark
Treaties of Djibouti
Treaties of Dominica
Treaties of the Dominican Republic
Treaties of Ecuador
Treaties of Egypt
Treaties of El Salvador
Treaties of Equatorial Guinea
Treaties of Eritrea
Treaties of Estonia
Treaties of Ethiopia
Treaties of Fiji
Treaties of Finland
Treaties of France
Treaties of Gabon
Treaties of the Gambia
Treaties of Georgia (country)
Treaties of Germany
Treaties of Ghana
Treaties of Greece
Treaties of Grenada
Treaties of Guatemala
Treaties of Guinea
Treaties of Guinea-Bissau
Treaties of Guyana
Treaties of Haiti
Treaties of the Holy See
Treaties of Honduras
Treaties of Hungary
Treaties of Iceland
Treaties of India
Treaties of Indonesia
Treaties of Iraq
Treaties of Ireland
Treaties of Israel
Treaties of Italy
Treaties of Jamaica
Treaties of Japan
Treaties of Jordan
Treaties of Kazakhstan
Treaties of Kenya
Treaties of Kiribati
Treaties of Kuwait
Treaties of Kyrgyzstan
Treaties of Laos
Treaties of Latvia
Treaties of Lebanon
Treaties of Lesotho
Treaties of Liberia
Treaties of the Libyan Arab Jamahiriya
Treaties of Liechtenstein
Treaties of Lithuania
Treaties of Luxembourg
Treaties of Madagascar
Treaties of Malawi
Treaties of Malaysia
Treaties of the Maldives
Treaties of Mali
Treaties of Malta
Treaties of the Marshall Islands
Treaties of Mauritania
Treaties of Mauritius
Treaties of Mexico
Treaties of the Federated States of Micronesia
Treaties of Monaco
Treaties of Mongolia
Treaties of Montenegro
Treaties of Morocco
Treaties of Mozambique
Treaties of Myanmar
Treaties of Namibia
Treaties of Nauru
Treaties of Nepal
Treaties of the Netherlands
Treaties of New Zealand
Treaties of Nicaragua
Treaties of Niger
Treaties of Nigeria
Treaties of Niue
Treaties of North Korea
Treaties of Norway
Treaties of Oman
Treaties of Pakistan
Treaties of the State of Palestine
Treaties of Panama
Treaties of Paraguay
Treaties of Peru
Treaties of the Philippines
Treaties of Poland
Treaties of Portugal
Treaties of Qatar
Treaties of South Korea
Treaties of Moldova
Treaties of Romania
Treaties of Russia
Treaties of Rwanda
Treaties of Samoa
Treaties of San Marino
Treaties of São Tomé and Príncipe
Treaties of Saudi Arabia
Treaties of Senegal
Treaties of Serbia and Montenegro
Treaties of Seychelles
Treaties of Singapore
Treaties of Slovakia
Treaties of Slovenia
Treaties of South Africa
Treaties of Spain
Treaties of Sri Lanka
Treaties of Saint Kitts and Nevis
Treaties of Saint Lucia
Treaties of Saint Vincent and the Grenadines
Treaties of Sierra Leone
Treaties of the Republic of the Sudan (1985–2011)
Treaties of Suriname
Treaties of Eswatini
Treaties of Sweden
Treaties of Switzerland
Treaties of Syria
Treaties of Tajikistan
Treaties of North Macedonia
Treaties of Thailand
Treaties of East Timor
Treaties of Togo
Treaties of Tonga
Treaties of Trinidad and Tobago
Treaties of Tunisia
Treaties of Turkey
Treaties of Turkmenistan
Treaties of Uganda
Treaties of Ukraine
Treaties of the United Arab Emirates
Treaties of the United Kingdom
Treaties of Tanzania
Treaties of the United States
Treaties of Uruguay
Treaties of Uzbekistan
Treaties of Vanuatu
Treaties of Venezuela
Treaties of Vietnam
Treaties of Yemen
Treaties of Zambia
Treaties of Zimbabwe
Treaties entered into by the European Union
International criminal law treaties
2000 in New York (state)
Treaties adopted by United Nations General Assembly resolutions
Treaties extended to Aruba
Treaties extended to the Falkland Islands
Treaties extended to Gibraltar
Treaties extended to the Cayman Islands
Treaties extended to the British Virgin Islands
Treaties extended to the Isle of Man
Treaties extended to the Netherlands Antilles
Treaties extended to Hong Kong
Treaties extended to Macau
Treaties extended to Guernsey
Treaties extended to Jersey
Treaties extended to Anguilla
Treaties extended to the Turks and Caicos Islands